The Territorial Court of Yukon is the lower trial court in the court system of the Canadian territory of Yukon. The court sits permanently in Whitehorse but also provides services in 14 other communities including Dawson City and Watson Lake.

Responsibilities
According to the official website of the government of Yukon, the court deals with most  criminal prosecutions in the territory under the Criminal Code and other federal statutes, as well as young offenders and offences under the laws of Yukon. It also handles bail hearings, first appearances, trials and sentencing, and has jurisdiction over both summary and indictable offences.

The Territorial Court does not deal with most matters of family law, such as divorce, child custody and adoption. Its jurisdiction in civil cases is limited to $25,000.

Composition
The court has three full-time judges and twelve deputy judges, predominantly retired judges from other jurisdictions. The Justice of the Peace Court, which is also part of the Territorial Court, consists of one full-time judge and 32 part-time Justices of the Peace, who are not legally qualified.

List of Current Judges

Presiding Judges
 Judge Karen Ruddy
 Judge Michael Cozens
 Chief Judge Peter Chisholm

Deputy Judges
 Justice Michael S. Block, Ontario
 Judge Michel Chartier, Manitoba
 Judge Thomas Crabtree, British Columbia
 Justice Joseph De Filippis, Ontario
 Judge William Digby, Nova Scotia
 Judge John Faulkner, Yukon
 Judge Christine V. Harapiak, Manitoba
 Judge Murray J. Hinds, Saskatchewan
 Judge Martin Lambert, Ontario
 Judge Heino Lilles, Yukon
 Judge Donald S. Luther, Newfoundland
 Judge E. Ann Marie MacInnes, Nova Scotia
 Judge Gerald Morin, Saskatchewan
 Judge Brian M. Neal, British Columbia
 Judge Nancy K. Orr, Prince Edward Island
 Judge James Plemel, Saskatchewan
 Judge E. Dennis Schmidt, British Columbia
 Judge Richard D. Schneider, Ontario
 Judge Herman J. Seidemann III, British Columbia
 Judge Carol Ann Snell, Saskatchewan
 Judge Murray P. Thompson, Manitoba
 Judge David C. Walker, New Brunswick
 Judge Timothy W. White, Saskatchewan
 Judge Pamela Williams, Nova Scotia
 Judge Raymond E. Wyant, Manitoba

References

External links
 Territorial Court of Yukon website
 Territorial Court Act
 List of Territorial Judges

Yukon courts
Yukon